The Apotheosis of Voltaire led by Truth and crowned by Glory (”), also known as “The Triumph of Voltaire” is a 1775 oil painting by Alexandre Duplessis.

In the centre of the painting, Melpomene muse of tragedy, leads Voltaire towards Apollo while behind the god a putto holds up a waiting crown of immortality. Behind Voltaire, various critics and enemies are driven into hell while Thalia, muse of comedy, laughs in amusement. In the background other putti hang a wreath over a bust of Voltaire. Above Voltaire the chariot of Apollo, empty, approaches from across the sky. On the right stands the Temple of Memory with its central niche vacant, flanked by Sophocles and Euripides on one side with Corneille and Racine on the other. Many other details in the painting are described in twenty-three lines of commentary at the bottom of the print edition.

The artist, Alexandre Duplessis, an amateur who worked mainly in Lyon, approached Voltaire for permission to paint him. Although in his correspondence Voltaire compared him to Rubens, Madame de Genlis described the painting as a pub sign (“enseigne à bière”).

Voltaire owned the original painting, which is still in the collection at Ferney. Duplessis created several engravings of the painting, probably when Voltaire's remains were transferred to the Panthéon in 1791, or soon after.

There is also a different painting currently in the collection of the Musée Carnavalet by Robert-Guillaume Dardel which is known both as “Allegory to the glory of Voltaire” and as “The Apotheosis of Voltaire”. Another painting, based on Dardel’s work is currently in the National Gallery of Art.

References

External links
colour image of the original painting
3-minute video about the painting (in French)

Voltaire
1775 works